Chapel Common is a  biological Site of Special Scientific Interest west of Fernhurst in West Sussex. A Roman road through the common is a Scheduled Monument. 

Most of the common is dry heathland but there are also areas of woodland, grassland and scrub. Heathland birds include three internationally important species listed on Annex I of the EU Birds Directive, woodlark, nightjar and Dartford warbler. The site also has rare and scarce  invertebrates.

Several public footpaths cross the common.

References

Sites of Special Scientific Interest in West Sussex